John Lawton (1656–1736) was an English Member of Parliament

He was the eldest son of William Lawton of Lawton, Cheshire.

He was Mayor of Newcastle-under-Lyme for 1692–93 and was a deputy Lieutenant for Cheshire and Staffordshire by 1701, probably until his death. He was elected Member of Parliament  for Newcastle-under-Lyme in 1689, 1695, 1706, and 1709.

He married twice, firstly Anne, the daughter of George Montagu of Horton, Northamptonshire, with whom he had 7 sons (6 of whom predeceased him) and 8 daughters and secondly his cousin Mary, the daughter of Edward Longueville of Iver, Buckinghamshire and widow of Sir Edward Longueville, 3rd Baronet of Wolverton, with whom he had another son.

References

 

1656 births
1736 deaths
People from Cheshire
English MPs 1689–1690
English MPs 1695–1698
English MPs 1705–1707
British MPs 1707–1708
British MPs 1708–1710
Members of the Parliament of Great Britain for Newcastle-under-Lyme
Members of the Parliament of England for Newcastle-under-Lyme